This is a list of hillside letters (also known as mountain monograms) in the U.S. state of Arizona. There are at least 63 hillside letters, acronyms, and messages in the state, possibly more. Arizona's most notable monograms are likely the pair of A's for Arizona State University and the University of Arizona that are a focus of their rivalry. Arizona also has a fictional monogram, the RS for Radiator Springs in the movie Cars.

References

External links

Mountain Monograms, a website explaining the origins and with an incomplete list and pictures
Hillside Letters, a companion website to a book on the subject
Letters on Hills, a category on waymarking.com for geocachers

Arizona
Arizona geography-related lists
Lists of public art in the United States